Aigburth railway station serves the Aigburth district of Liverpool, England.  It is situated on the Southport–Hunts Cross route of the Northern Line of the Merseyrail suburban system.

History
The station, originally called Mersey Road & Aigburth, opened in 1864 as part of the Garston and Liverpool Railway line between Brunswick and Garston Dock. In 1865 the station and line were incorporated into the Cheshire Lines Committee.

The station closed in April 1972 but reopened in January 1978 as part of the Kirkby–Garston line of the Merseyrail system. Services were extended from Garston to Hunts Cross in 1983, and diverted to Southport instead of Kirkby in 1984.

From 11 December 2006 the Monday to Saturday evening service was increased to run every 15 minutes, instead of half-hourly as previously.

Facilities
The station is staffed during all opening hours. There is a payphone, booking office and live departure and arrival screens for passenger information. The station has a free car park with 16 spaces, as well as secure indoor storage for 10 cycles. The station does not have step-free access for either platform and is not suitable for wheelchairs and prams.

Services
Trains operate every 20 minutes, Monday-Saturday to Southport via Liverpool Central to the north, and Hunts Cross to the south. On Sundays, services are every 30 minutes in each direction.

Gallery

Notes

References

 
 
 
 Station on navigable O.S. map

External links

Railway stations in Liverpool
DfT Category E stations
Former Cheshire Lines Committee stations
Railway stations served by Merseyrail
Railway stations in Great Britain opened in 1864
Railway stations in Great Britain closed in 1972
Railway stations in Great Britain opened in 1978